Harold Wright Cruse (March 8, 1916 – March 26, 2005) was an American academic who was a social critic and teacher of African American studies at the University of Michigan until the mid-1980s. The Crisis of the Negro Intellectual (1967) is his best-known book.

Biography

Early life
Harold Cruse was born March 8, 1916, in Petersburg, Virginia. His father was a railway porter. After his parents divorced, Cruse moved to New York City, New York. Cruse became interested in the arts as a young man, thanks in large measure to his close relationship with an aunt who often took him to shows on the weekend. During World War II, Cruse joined the U.S. Army and served in Europe and north Africa. Upon returning home, he attended the City College of New York without graduating. 

In 1947 Cruse joined the Communist Party for several years. Citing a November 26, 1956, document contained in an FBI's declassified Internal case file (No. 100-370842 of assorted documents date August 7, 1950, to January 9, 1969) on Harold Cruse obtained under provisions of Freedom of Information Act, Washington University in St. Louis Associate Professor of English and African-American Studies William J. Maxwell noted on page 106 of his 2015 book F.B. Eyes that "Harold Cruse" was "recruited as an undercover Communist Party informant (he proved willing to name names of onetime co-members, but nothing more)."

Theater career
Cruse viewed the arts scene as a white-dominated misrepresentation of black culture, epitomized by George Gershwin's folk opera Porgy and Bess and Lorraine Hansberry's play A Raisin in the Sun.

Many believed Cruse was an opponent of "integration" which he referred to as "assimilation" because its policies were only geared towards integrating blacks into white society and not whites into black; betraying an inherent unacceptability of blackness in mainstream America. But in reality Cruse simply believed in a pluralistic society, any group must amass and control its own political, economic and cultural capital before true integration was possible. Without group self-determination, any group, but particularly American blacks would rely on the benevolence of other groups with political, economic and cultural capital, to voluntarily integrate with blacks which would lead to the dismantlement of black institutions and cultural traditions; rather than facilitate an equal and negotiated sharing throughout society.

While Cruse was very critical of American society, he reserved the bulk of his criticism for black intellectuals and leaders who he believed did not have the academic appetite to master the various disciplines necessary to advocate for real and effective societal change.

Academic life
After publishing The Crisis of the Negro Intellectual in 1967, he was invited to lecture at the University of Michigan (1968) and taught in the African-American Studies program at the Center for Afro-American and African Studies there until the mid-1980s. Cruse was one of the first African-American studies professors, becoming one of the first to earn tenure without holding a college degree.

A theme of The Crisis of the Negro Intellectual is that intellectuals must play a central role in movements for radical change. This idea re-appeared in Cruse's other works including Rebellion or Revolution, a compilation of essays, and Plural But Equal.

Death and legacy
On March 26, 2005, Cruse died from congestive heart failure while living in an assisted-living facility in Ann Arbor, Michigan. He was survived by his partner of 36 years, Mara Julius.

Works

Footnotes

Further reading

"Harold Cruse and Afrocentric Theory"

External links 

FBI files on Harold Cruse

1916 births
2005 deaths
African-American academics
African-American writers
American writers
American communists
African-American communists
People from Petersburg, Virginia
University of Michigan faculty
United States Army personnel of World War II